The 1918 Tennessee gubernatorial election was held on November 5, 1918. Democratic nominee Albert H. Roberts defeated Republican nominee Hugh B. Lindsay with 62.37% of the vote.

General election

Candidates
Albert H. Roberts, Democratic
Hugh B. Lindsay, Republican

Results

References

1918
Tennessee
Gubernatorial